Rasigar Mandram is a 2007 Tamil language drama film directed and  written Pugazhendhi Thangaraj. The film stars Uma, newcomer Ganesh and newcomer Gokul Krishna, and Bhanu, with Mansoor Ali Khan, Babu Ganesh, Jaguar Thangam, Bose Venkat, and Madhan Bob playing supporting roles. The film had musical score by S. P. Boopathy and was released on 25 May 2007.

Plot

Rameshkanth (Mansoor Ali Khan) and Sathya (Babu Ganesh) are the most famous heroes of Tamil cinema. Kathiravan alias Kathir (Ganesh) is a fan of Rameshkanth, while Pandian (Gokul Krishna) is a fan of Sathya. They are heads of their respective fan clubs in their village, and they have a go at each other at every opportunity. Bharathi (Uma) is the new music teacher of the village school and is surprised to see that the village young men are all members of a cinema actor's fan club.

When a foreign water company took water with the government permission from the village, Annachi (Jaguar Thangam) with few villagers demonstrates in the street. Bharathi then explains to the villagers that the water plant would make the village a desert. Kathir's fan club members and Pandian's fan club members decide to protest on their respective sides. Bharathi wanted the fans to make peace, and Annachi reveals that they were all friends a few years back. In the past, Kathir and Pandian were friends, and Kathir's sister Kavitha (Bhanu) was about to marry Pandian. But one day, Pandian made fun of Kathir's favorite actor Rameshkanth, the friends fought, and the wedding was cancelled.

The local politician Peethamparam (Mansoor Ali Khan) is getting money from the water company to support the project. Peethambaram resorts to the divide and rule policy in the village; therefore, he creates a conflict between the two fan clubs. Pandian's group burns Kathir's fan club made with coconut leaves; thereafter, Peethamparam offers Kathir a small ground to construct a fan club. Rameshkanth then donates a huge amount for constructing a solid silver statue of him and the fan club. In the meantime, Kathir and Bharathi fall in love with each other. Bharathi then advises Kathir to build a school in place of a fan club. One day, Pandian leaves his sick mother to attend Sathya's new film Pooja. His mother then died, and Kathir does all the funeral rites. After his return to the village, Pandian is heartbroken. Pandian and Kathir patch up a quarrel, and the fan clubs are dissolved. Bharathi gathered more than 3000 signatures on a petition to stop the project and send it to Delhi. Finally, a collector visits the village and cancels the company's license, the company was allowed to bore to 300 ft but the company bored to 2000 ft.

Cast

Uma as Bharathi
Ganesh as Kathiravan alias Kathir
Gokul Krishna as Pandian
Bhanu as Kavitha
Mansoor Ali Khan as Rameshkanth and Peethamparam
Babu Ganesh as Sathya
Jaguar Thangam as Annachi
Bose Venkat as Lorry driver
Madhan Bob
Arulmani as Pandian's father
Srilatha as Pandian's mother
Theni Murugan as Lakshmanan
Saira Bhanu
Chella
Raghuraj Chakravarthy
Suja Varunee as item number

Soundtrack

The film score and the soundtrack were composed by S. P. Boopathy. The soundtrack, released in 2007, features 5 tracks with lyrics written by Kabilan, P. Krishnan, Kathirmozhi and Bharathan.

Reception
A reviewer from Sulekha said, "Director Pugazhendi has made a daring attempt bringing out the flaws in his own industry. Though a bold attempt, Pugazhendi has failed to capture the attention of the audience". Another reviewer wrote, "The director has tried to convey a message but failed at many places. Had the screenplay be stronger the film would have definitely been a hit. But still it is a good attempt". Chennai Online wrote "The film could have been a light-hearted satire, or an in-depth assessment of the negative impact on young minds of obsessive star worship. But it turns out to be neither. The scripting is lacklustre and the takes amateurish."

References

2007 films
2000s Tamil-language films
Indian drama films
Films about water
Water scarcity in fiction
Films about actors
Films shot in Tamil Nadu